In computer networking, per-hop behaviour (PHB) is a term used in differentiated services (DiffServ) or multiprotocol label switching (MPLS). It defines the policy and priority applied to a packet when traversing a hop (such as a router) in a DiffServ network.

See also 
 Best-effort delivery

Internet architecture